Pernand-Vergelesses is a commune in the Côte-d'Or department in eastern France.

Population

Wine

Pernand-Vergelesses is one of the wine communes of the Côte de Beaune. The western side of the Corton hill is in the commune, including vineyards used to produce the Grand Cru wine Corton-Charlemagne.

See also
Communes of the Côte-d'Or department

References

Communes of Côte-d'Or